This is a selected list of notable, natural landscape features in England, Scotland, Wales and Northern Ireland. It includes isolated, scenic, or spectacular surface rock outcrops. These formations are usually the result of weathering and erosion sculpting the existing rock. For the stratigraphic term 'formation' applied by geologists to rock sequences, see Formation (stratigraphy).

England
Avon Gorge, Bristol
Brimham Rocks, Nidderdale, Yorkshire
Cheddar Gorge and Cave, Somerset
Cheesewring, Bodmin Moor, Cornwall
Dovedale, Derbyshire
Durdle Door, Dorset
Ebbor Gorge, Somerset
Hunstanton cliffs, Norfolk
Lathkill Dale, Derbyshire
Lydford Gorge, Devon
The Needles, Isle of Wight
Old Harry Rocks, Dorset
Penninis, St. Mary's, Isles of Scilly
Pulpit Rock, Isle of Portland, Dorset
Tar Rocks, Isle of Portland, Dorset

Scotland
Ailsa Craig, Firth of Clyde
Arthur's Seat, Edinburgh
Bass Rock, Firth of Forth
Beinn Eighe, Wester Ross
The Cobbler, Argyll and Bute
Corrieshalloch Gorge, Ullapool
Dumbarton Rock
Duncansby Head, John o' Groats
Glen Nevis, Fort William
Gloup Ness, Cullivoe, Shetland Islands
Liathach, Wester Ross
Old Man of Hoy, Orkney Islands
Sgurr Nan Conbhairean, Kyle of Lochalsh
Stac Biorach, St Kilda archipelago
Stac Pollaidh, Wester Ross
Three Sisters, Glen Coe

Wales
 Dinas Rock, Powys
Mew Slade
Solva, St. David's Head, Dyfed
Flat Holm, Glamorgan
St. Govan's Head, Pembrokeshire
St. Mary's Well Bay, Cardiff
Three Cliffs Bay Park, Swansea
South Stack, Holy Island, Anglesey
Stackpole Head, Pembrokeshire
Dylife Gorge, near Machynlleth, Powys
Worm's Head, Rhossili, Gower

Northern Ireland
White Rocks Beach, Bushmills, County Antrim
Giant's Causeway, County Antrim
Ballintoy, County Antrim
Waterloo Bay, Larne

See also
 Jurassic Coast

 
Rock formations of Ireland
United Kingdom geology-related lists